Matheus Mendes Werneck de Oliveira (born 10 March 1999) is a Brazilian professional footballer who plays as a goalkeeper for Atlético Mineiro.

Club career
Born in Governador Valadares, Minas Gerais, Mendes joined Atlético Mineiro's youth setup in 2014. In January 2020, he was assigned to the first team squad.

On 16 September 2020, Mendes joined CSA on loan until the end of the 2020 Série B season. He promptly established himself as the first choice goalkeeper, making 28 league appearances for the side.

International career
Mendes received a call up to the Brazil U20s in October 2018.

Career statistics

Honours
Atlético Mineiro
Campeonato Brasileiro Série A: 2021
Copa do Brasil: 2021
Campeonato Mineiro: 2020, 2021, 2022
Supercopa do Brasil: 2022

References

External links

1999 births
Living people
People from Governador Valadares
Brazilian footballers
Association football goalkeepers
Campeonato Brasileiro Série B players
Clube Atlético Mineiro players
Centro Sportivo Alagoano players
Sportspeople from Minas Gerais